The Mistake is a 1913 American silent drama film directed by  D. W. Griffith.

Cast
 Blanche Sweet as The Young Woman
 Henry B. Walthall as Jack, the Friend, a Prospector
 Charles Hill Mailes as The Husband, A Prospector
 Harry Carey
 Charles Gorman as Indian
 Harry Hyde as Indian
 J. Jiquel Lanoe as Indian
 Hector Sarno as Indian

See also
 Harry Carey filmography
 D. W. Griffith filmography

References

External links

1913 films
Films directed by D. W. Griffith
1913 short films
American silent short films
Biograph Company films
American black-and-white films
1913 drama films
Films with screenplays by Anita Loos
Silent American drama films
1910s American films